Afghan University is located in Kabul, Afghanistan, and officially started working in 2012. It is a private university..

External links
 Afghan University

Universities in Afghanistan
2012 establishments in Afghanistan
Private universities in Afghanistan
Educational institutions established in 2012